Shemar Samson Jean-Charles (born June 20, 1998) is an American football cornerback for the Green Bay Packers of the National Football League (NFL). He played college football at Appalachian State.

Professional career
Jean-Charles was selected 178th overall by the Green Bay Packers in the 2021 NFL Draft. He signed his rookie contract on May 14, 2021.

NFL career statistics

Regular season

Postseason

References

External links
Green Bay Packers bio
Appalachian State Mountaineers bio

1998 births
Living people
People from Miramar, Florida
Players of American football from Florida
Sportspeople from Broward County, Florida
American football cornerbacks
Appalachian State Mountaineers football players
Green Bay Packers players
Miramar High School alumni